Samsung Galaxy Chat GT-B5330 is an Android-based smartphone by Samsung, announced in July 2012 and released in August 2012. Its main features are 3G connection with speeds up to 7.2Mbit/s and Wi-Fi.

Features
Galaxy Chat features Android 4.0.4 Ice Cream Sandwich  and then upgraded to 4.1.2 Jelly Bean OS with Samsung's proprietary TouchWiz user interface, and has integrated social networking apps and multimedia features, including Google Voice Search, and 7.1 channel audio enhancements. It also has a standard 3.5 mm audio jack.
The device sports an 850 MHz, 4 GB of internal memory and supports up to 32 GB of removable storage through a microSD card. The phone has a 2 MP camera, a screen with a 240x320 resolution and a multitouch interface. As input interface includes a physical QWERTY keyboard.
The phone offers connectivity options such as HSDPA 3G connection up to 7.2Mbit/s and a Wi-Fi connection. The phone also offers Remote Controls which allows phone to be locked, tracked and data to be wiped remotely.

Processor
The Galaxy Chat uses an 850 MHz.
it uses board 'rhea' which has a broadcom BCM21654 chipset clocked at 850 MHz.

Memory
The Galaxy Chat features 4
GB of dedicated flash internal storage.
It has microSDHC slot (up to 32 GB).

Display
The Galaxy Chat uses a  QVGA (240*320) TFT LCD capacitive touchscreen which has a Pixel density (PPI) of 133.

Camera
On the back of the device is a 2-megapixel fixed-focus camera without flash that can record videos in up to a maximum QVGA Resolution. Galaxy Chat does not have a front-facing camera.

See also
Samsung Galaxy (series)
List of Android devices

References

Android (operating system) devices
Galaxy Chat
Mobile phones introduced in 2012
Samsung smartphones